David Dóniga Lara (born 7 September 1981) is a Spanish football manager and former player who played as a forward.

Career
Born in Torrejón de Ardoz, Community of Madrid, Dóniga represented AD Torrejón CF before joining the youth categories of Real Madrid. He made his debut as a senior with CD Guadalajara, while being in charge of a youth school in Daganzo de Arriba.

Dóniga was a manager of the Alevín squads of local sides RSD Alcalá and AD Complutense before joining Soto de Alcobendas CF as an assistant. After leaving the club in 2007, he worked as Manolo Alfaro's assistant at CD San Fernando de Henares, Talavera CF and CD Toledo.

Dóniga worked as a fitness coach in Alfaro's staff at Bolivian side CD Jorge Wilstermann and Emirati club Al Wasl SC before being named Víctor Sánchez's assistant at Deportivo de La Coruña in 2015. He continued to work with Sánchez in the following years, at Olympiacos FC, Real Betis and Málaga CF.

In 2020, Dóniga joined Pablo Franco's staff at Qadsia SC in Kuwait.

On 31 August 2022, Dóniga was appointed manager of Ecuadorian Serie A club 9 de Octubre FC.

References

External links
 

1981 births
Living people
People from Torrejón de Ardoz
Footballers from the Community of Madrid
Spanish footballers
Spanish football managers
CD Guadalajara (Spain) footballers
Spanish expatriate football managers
Spanish expatriate sportspeople in Bolivia
Spanish expatriate sportspeople in the United Arab Emirates
Spanish expatriate sportspeople in Greece
Spanish expatriate sportspeople in Kuwait
Spanish expatriate sportspeople in Panama
Spanish expatriate sportspeople in Ecuador
Expatriate football managers in Ecuador
9 de Octubre F.C. managers